Sara Minkara is a Lebanese-American inclusion and disability expert. She is a disability rights advocate who serves as the United States Special Advisor on International Disability Rights in the U.S. Department of State.

Personal life and education 
Minkara is of Lebanese descent and is a first-generation immigrant American. She is both Muslim and blind. Ms. Minkara became legally blind when she was seven years old.

She received her Bachelor of Arts at Wellesley College and her Master of Public Policy at Harvard University.

Career 
Minkara founded the non-profit organization Empowerment Through Integration (ETI) and the company Sara Minkara LLC. ETI works with blind children, including refugees in Lebanon to help them build independence and learn life skills, like how to walk with a white cane or use a computer. ETI also runs a summer camp for both blind and sighted children that promotes social skills. Sara Minkara LLC is a consulting and advisory firm that promotes authentic leadership through customized services for clients around the world. She established ETI when she was an undergraduate student.

Minkara has been recognized by the Clinton Foundation's Clinton Global Initiative, and Forbes listed her in its Forbes 30 Under 30 list. In 2014–2015, she was a fellow at the Harvard University's Carr Center for Human Rights Policy and later a Dublin Fellow at John F. Kennedy School of Government at Harvard University. She was also a Halycon fellow, an Echoing Green fellow, the recipient of the Emily Bultch Peace and Justice Award, and MIT IDEAS Award, and a Harvard Emerging Leader.

Minkara was a subject of the documentary "Losing Sight, But Gaining a Vision." The film, produced by Harvard graduate Gloria Hong, won the Grand Jury Prize at the 2015 Girls Impact the World Film Festival.

On October 28, 2021, United States President Joe Biden appointed Sara Minkara United States Special Advisor on International Disability Rights at the State Department. The position was established by President Barack Obama. It was not filled during the Donald Trump presidency.

References 

American disability rights activists
American people of Lebanese descent
American Muslims
Wellesley College alumni
Harvard University alumni
Living people
Year of birth missing (living people)
American blind people